Molash is a civil parish and village in Kent, South East England. It contains a small part of an Area of Outstanding Natural Beauty (AONB) - the North Downs - and is on the A252 road between Canterbury, Ashford and Faversham.

Geography
Molash is a scattered semi-rural community buffered and characterised by its own farmland and a borderland forest called King's Wood almost all part of the higher, more wooded village, Godmersham, which was historically a royal hunting forest. The hunt was for deer, and a large herd of Fallow Deer still run free in the wood. The far south is well-marked and maintained as the Pilgrims' Way and North Downs Way pass through the forest as they follow the ridge of the North Downs.

Amenities
In the village, St. Peter's Church, built in the 13th century, with a Norman font and mostly 14th-century stained glass windows, was probably built on the site of an earlier church. The Yew trees in the churchyard are 2,000 years old.

Transport

In popular culture

Author Russell Hoban repurposes Molash as "Moal Arse" in his 1980, post apocalyptic novel Riddley Walker.

References

External links

Statistical civil parish overview - map

Villages in Kent
Villages in the Borough of Ashford
Civil parishes in Ashford, Kent